Brad Giffen is a retired Canadian news anchor who has worked on television in both Canada and the United States.

Over his broadcasting career he has also worked as a radio personality, disc jockey, VJ, television reporter, television producer and voice-over artist.

Broadcasting career 

Giffen graduated from the Poynter Institute for Advanced Journalism Study.  In the 1980s he was a broadcaster on both CHUM and CHUM-FM radio stations out of Toronto, Ontario, Canada, and was also one of John Majhor's replacement veejays on CITY-TV's music video program Toronto Rocks.<ref>Hume, Christopher. "Farm crisis probed on special", Toronto Star", Aug 24, 1987, pg B3</ref> In 1985, he hosted the CBC Television battle of the bands competition Rock Wars.

In 1990, Giffen became a reporter for CFTO's nightly news program World Beat News (later rebranded as CFTO News in early 1998, and CTV News in 2005).

In 1993, Giffen moved to the United States and became co-anchor of the nightly news on the Fox affiliate KSTU, out of Salt Lake City, Utah.Rolly, Paul. "ROLLY & WELLS ...", Salt Lake Tribune, Sep 22, 1993, pg D1  Giffen left that post in 1995.

Giffen went on to become the anchorman for ABC affiliate WGNO in New Orleans, Louisiana until 2002.  While in New Orleans he also hosted and produced the program ABC26 News This Week''.

From 2003 to 2008 he anchored the 5:30PM newscast at ABC affiliate WWSB in Sarasota, Florida.

Giffen returned to Canada in 2008 to work this time as an anchor for CTV News Channel. He retired from broadcasting in 2018 to become a full-time voice-over artist.

Personal life 

Giffen has two children.  He "spends his free time skiing, kayaking and learning how to salsa dance."

Awards 

Giffen was awarded "Best In-Depth News Reporting" by the Utah Broadcaster's Association.  He was also awarded "Best Newscast with Special Distinction" by the Louisiana Broadcaster's Association.

References 

Journalists from Toronto
Canadian radio personalities
Canadian VJs (media personalities)
Canadian television news anchors
Living people
20th-century Canadian journalists
21st-century Canadian journalists
Year of birth missing (living people)